John Joe Sheehan (6 May 1929 – 16 June 2020) was an Irish Gaelic footballer. At club level he played with the Killarney Legion club and was a two-time All-Ireland Championship winner with the Kerry senior football team.

Playing career

Born in Farranfore, Sheehan first enjoyed success when, in 1946 and still a schoolboy, he won a Kerry County Championship medal with Killarney Legion and an All-Ireland Minor Championship with the Kerry minor football team. While training to be a teacher at St. Patrick's College he was selected for the Dublin senior football team but declared for Kerry and made his debut in the first round of the 1949-50 league. Sheehan captained Kerry to the Munster Championship title in 1951, before a spinal injury ruled him out of the game before a comeback which saw him win two All-Ireland Championship medals from three final appearances between 1953 and 1955. He was also selected for the Munster inter-provincial team on a number of occasions.

Honours

Killarney Legion
Kerry Senior Football Championship (1): 1946

Kerry
All-Ireland Senior Football Championship (2): 1953, 1955
Munster Senior Football Championship (4): 1951 (c), 1953, 1954, 1955

References

External link

 John Joe Sheehan profile at the Terrace Talk website

1929 births
2020 deaths
Killarney Legion Gaelic footballers
Kerry inter-county Gaelic footballers
Munster inter-provincial Gaelic footballers